J.D. Irving Limited (JDI) is a privately owned conglomerate company headquartered in Saint John, New Brunswick, Canada.  It is a subsidiary of the parent company, Irving Group of Companies, along with Irving Oil Refinery, Canaport, Irving Tissue Irving Equipment, Kent Building Supplies, New Brunswick Railway, New Brunswick Southern Railway, Eastern Maine Railway, Maine Northern Railway, Brunswick News, Acadia Broadcasting, Irving Shipbuilding, Cavendish Farms. It is involved in many industries including forestry, forestry products, agriculture, food processing, transportation, and shipbuilding. JDI company forms, with Irving Oil, Ocean Capital Investments and Brunswick News, the bulk of the Irving Group of Companies, which groups the interests of the Irving family.

History
J.D. Irving Limited (JDI) traces its roots to a sawmill operated in Bouctouche, New Brunswick by its namesake, James Dergavel Irving. J.D. Irving's operations were entrusted to his children, one of whom, Kenneth Colin Irving, assumed majority ownership and used JDI as a springboard for expanding into pulp and paper and other forestry-related businesses between the 1920s and 1940s.

In the post-war years, JDI took control of pulp mills in Saint John and upstate New York, as well as sawmills throughout New Brunswick.  During the 1950s, JDI took control of a shipyard in Saint John and started several trucking companies and heavy industry companies like Irving Equipment to satisfy the growing needs of the company.

From the 1960s-2000s, JDI expanded to become the largest forestry company in the Maritimes and northern Maine and the region's largest industrial player, with extensive land holdings, tree nurseries, pulp mills (plants producing kraft pulp, supercalendered paper, tissue products, and corrugated medium), sawmills, a retail chain of home improvement stores (Kent Building Supplies), modular home construction (Kent Homes), industrial construction, wallboard manufacturing, marine towing and dredging (Atlantic Towing), prefabricated concrete (StresCon), steel fabrication (Ocean Steel), frozen food production (Cavendish Farms), fertilizer and agri-services (Cavendish Agri-Services), railways (New Brunswick Southern Railway), and manufacturing of personal care products including tissue and paper towels (Majesta and Royale) as well as diapers (Irving Personal Care).

In the 1970s and 1980s, JDI expanded into trucking with its Scot Truck subsidiary based in Debert, NS. Now called Midland Transport and based in Dieppe, NB, it is joined by sister companies Midland Courier (Dieppe), Sunbury Transport (Fredericton) and RST Industries (Saint John).

JDI is also the largest shipbuilder in Canada with ownership of shipyards in Halifax, Liverpool, Shelburne, and Georgetown.

Incidents
As a large regional industrial conglomerate, J.D. Irving Ltd. subsidiaries have been the focus of several notable incidents:
 In 1970 an oil barge named Irving Whale sank in the Gulf of St. Lawrence causing periodic oil spills until it was raised by the federal government in 1996.
 In 2007 the Irving Pulp & Paper Ltd. mill at Reversing Falls accidentally released 680,000 litres of green liquid into the Saint John River; pleading guilty, the company received a fine of $50,000. In November 2008 Environment Canada investigators exercised a search warrant at Irving Pulp & Paper's head office to seek more information on this accidental spill.
 In November 2008 JDI Logistics and Atlantic Towing made the news over an accident involving the transport of 2 new turbines from Saint John Harbour to the nearby Point Lepreau Nuclear Generating Station.  The JDI subsidiaries had been sub-contracted by Siemens AG, Turbine Replacement sub-contractor for the facility's owner NB Power.  The 2 turbines were manufactured by Siemens AG in Scotland and were shipped to Saint John on a road transport vehicle aboard a cargo ship.  The cargo was off-loaded from the ship onto a barge owned by Atlantic Towing Ltd., however the cargo shifted and the barge tipped, sending the turbines and the road transport vehicle into Saint John Harbour. 
The barge crew of 3 was rescued by a CH-149 Cormorant search and rescue helicopter before the barge capsized. Several ATL tugboats and commercial divers responded and a tow line was secured to the capsized, yet floating, barge by the tugboat Atlantic Oak.

Controversies

J.D. Irving’s ownership of most major media outlets in New Brunswick has led to ongoing concern regarding control of the media. A report from the Canadian Senate in 2006 on media control in Canada singled out New Brunswick because of the Irving companies' ownership of all English-language daily newspapers in the province, including the Telegraph-Journal. Senator Joan Fraser, author of the Senate report, stated, "We didn't find anywhere else in the developed world a situation like the situation in New Brunswick." The report went further, stating, "the Irvings' corporate interests form an industrial-media complex that dominates the province" to a degree "unique in developed countries." At the Senate hearing, journalists and academics cited Irving newspapers' lack of critical reporting on the family's influential businesses.

Divisions
The following is a list of divisions of J.D. Irving, Ltd.

Irving Forest Products & Services
 Irving Pulp & Paper Ltd.
 Irving Paper Ltd.
 Irving Tissue Co. Ltd.
 Lake Utopia Paper
 Irving Sawmill Division
 Irving Woodlands Division

Irving Transportation Services
 New Brunswick Railway Co. Ltd.
 New Brunswick Southern Railway Co. Ltd.
 Eastern Maine Railway Co. Ltd.
 Maine Northern Railway Co. Ltd.
 Midland Transport
 Midland Courier
 RST Industries
 Sunbury Transport
 Atlantic Towing
 Kent Line
 JDI Logistics
 Harbour Development

Irving Shipbuilding & Fabrication Services
 Saint John Shipbuilding
 Halifax Shipyard
 Shelburne Ship Repair
 Woodside Industries
 Fleetway Inc.
 Oceanic Consulting Corporation

East Isle Shipyard

East Isle Shipyard is a shipbuilding facility in Georgetown, Prince Edward Island and owned by Irving. The small shipyard is located on Water Street with single slipway along Georgetown Harbour. It is the sole shipbuilding facility in the province.

It was founded as Bathurst Marine in Bathurst, New Brunswick in 1961 before moving to Georgetown in 1965. The facility has operated in various names but with current name since the 1990s.

The yard built trawlers in the 1960s, the diversified in the 1970s before it began to specialize in tugs in the 1990s.

In 2010 the shipyard laid off staff due to lack of orders.

Notable ships built here include:

 Atlantic Spruce fireboat tug (1995)
 Atlantic Oak tugboat (2004)
 Royal Canadian Navy's Glen class tugs:
CFAV Glenevis (YTB 642) (1976)
CFAV Glenbrook (YTB 643) (1976)
CFAV Glenside (YTB 644) (1977)

Irving Retail & Distribution Services
 Chandler
 Kent Building Supplies
 Universal Truck & Trailer
 Shamrock Truss
 Atlas Structural Systems
 Cavendish Agri Services

Irving Consumer Products
 Irving Tissue (Royale, Scotties, private labels)
 Irving Personal Care (diapers, training pants)
 Cavendish Produce (fresh vegetables)
 Cavendish Farms (frozen potato processing)
 Indian River Farms
 Riverdale Foods

Construction & Equipment Division
  Irving Wallboard
  Gulf Operators
 Irving Equipment (crane rental, heavy lifting, specialized transportation, pile driving and project management services)
  CFM
 Kent Homes
 PumpsPlus Ltd

Specialty Printing
 Plasticraft

Personnel Services
 Protrans Personnel Services Inc.

Security Services
 Industrial Security Limited

Amateur Sports
 Moncton Wildcats

Brunswick News
 Telegraph-Journal (Saint John NB)
 Times & Transcript (Moncton NB)
 The Daily Gleaner (Fredericton NB)
 The Tribune (Campbellton NB
 La Voix du Restigouche (Campbellton NB)
 The Bugle-Observer (Woodstock NB)
 Le Journal Madawaska (Edmundston NB)
 Victoria Star (Grand Falls NB)
L'Étoile (various editions)
 Édition provinciale
 Édition La Cataracte (Grand Falls NB)
 Édition Chaleur (Bathurst NB)
 Édition Dieppe (Dieppe NB)
 Édition Kent (Bouctouche NB)
 Édition Péninsule (Shippagan NB)
 Édition République (Edmundston NB)
 Édition Restigouche (Campbellton NB)
 Édition Shédiac (Shediac NB)
 Kings County Record (Sussex NB)
 Miramichi Leader (Miramichi NB)
 The Northern Light (Bathurst NB)
 Here (Saint John NB, Moncton NB, Fredericton NB)
 Money Saver (St. Stephen NB)

A selection of former subsidiaries
 Acadian Lines Ltd
 SMT (Eastern) Ltd. Bus Lines
 Saint John City Transit
 Hawk Communications
 Steel and Engine Products Ltd
 Pictou Shipyard
 Commercial Equipment Limited
 Maritime Tire
 MITI (AKA XWAVE)
 Barrington Industrial
 Lexitech
 Irving Industrial Rentals

Citations

References

External links
 Official website
 J.D. Irving, Equipment Division

Conglomerate companies of Canada
Food and drink companies of Canada
Pulp and paper companies of Canada
Transport companies of Canada
Companies based in Saint John, New Brunswick